Frank Severino (born Frank J. Severino June 2, 1936 – October 5, 1987) was an American jazz drummer.

He played with Warne Marsh during 1975. In the 1970s he was also part of guitarist Joe Pass's trio. He was based in Los Angeles at this time; critic Ted Panken described him and Donald Bailey as "first-call drummers" of the area. Severino appeared on Clark Terry's Memories of Duke album.

Taking after his father, Severino and Shelly Manne invented a drum with quick changeable batter heads.

Discography
 1965 Woman Talk, Carmen McRae
 1965 "Live" and Wailing, Carmen McRae
 1965 Billie Holiday Revisited, Billie Holiday
 1965 Red Soul, Red Holloway
 1967 Les Is More, Les McCann
 1973 It Takes a Whole Lot of Human Feeling, Carmen McRae
 1974 Live at Donte's Joe Pass
 1978 Soul Believer, Milt Jackson
 1979 Bags' Bag, Milt Jackson
 1980 Memories of Duke, Clark Terry
 1980 Mello' as a Cello, Al Viola
 1981 My Desiree, Tommy Tedesco
 1983 Coming Out, Johnny O'Neal
 1985 The River, Monty Alexander
 1992 Fine Fretted Friend, Tommy Tedesco
 1992 My Flame, Jim Nichols
 1992 Velvet Soul, Carmen McRae
 1994 Maybeck Recital Hall Series Vol. 40, Monty Alexander
 1995 I Was Born in Love with You, Denise Jannah
 1997 Guitar Virtuoso, Joe Pass
 1998 How's Your Mother?, Les McCann
 2000 Ballad Essentials, Monty Alexander
 2000 Les Incontournables, Clark Terry
 2000 Live in Las Vegas 1962, Warne Marsh
 2000 Ms. Jazz, Carmen McRae
 2000 Resonance, Joe Pass
 2003 I'll Never Be the Same, Marilena Paradisi
 2005 Live at the Iridium, Monty Alexander
 2006 Look at Me Now!, Laika Fatien
 2010 Second Chance, Irene Kral

References

1936 births
1987 deaths
American jazz drummers
American jazz percussionists
American jazz composers
American male jazz composers
20th-century American composers
20th-century American drummers
American male drummers
20th-century American male musicians
20th-century jazz composers